The book Wizard, the Life and Times of Nikola Tesla is a biography of Nikola Tesla by Marc J. Seifer published in 1996.

Contents
Seifer follows the life of Nikola Tesla, the Serbian American Invention|inventor, electrical engineer, mechanical engineer, physicist, and futurist. He covers the high points of the inventor's life through his designs used in the modern alternating current system, experimentation with high frequency current and wireless power transmission, wireless remote control, X-ray imaging, and Tesla's "death ray". Seifer goes on to cover Tesla's downfall, attributing it to Tesla's megalomaniacal, neurotic, self-destructive tendencies, and Tesla's interactions with financier J. Pierpont Morgan.

Seifer based his book largely on primary sourced documents including Tesla's writings and patents. Also including papers of Tesla's in the Tesla archives in Yugoslavia as well as manuscripts in the United States. Seifer filed Freedom of Information Act requests to get documents from the FBI and other United States government agencies.

Citations to the work
These publications have cited this book.
 Jasmina Vujic, Eng 24 Nikola Tesla: The Genius Who Lit the World
 Fred Nadis, New world orders. 
 Katherine Krumme, Mark Twain and Nikola Tesla: Thunder and Lightning
 Fred Nadis (2001). Of Horses, Planks, and Window Sleepers. Journal of Medical Humanities.
 Marc J Seifer, Nikola Tesla and John Jacob Astor

See also
George Westinghouse
Mihajlo Idvorski Pupin
Westinghouse Corporation
Hugo Gernsback
Robert Underwood Johnson
Induction motor 
Elihu Thomson
Thomas Edison
Guglielmo Marconi

Notes

Further reading
 Margaret Cheney, (2001). Tesla: Man Out of Time. 400 pages.
 Margaret Cheney, Robert Uth, Jim Glenn (1999). Tesla, Master of Lightning. 184 pages.
 Carol Dommermuth-Costa (1994). Nikola Tesla: A Spark of Genius. 128 pages.
 Thomas Valone (2002). Harnessing the Wheelwork of Nature: Tesla's Science of Energy. 288 pages.

1998 non-fiction books
Books about Nikola Tesla